Cutting is a commune in the Moselle department in Grand Est in north-eastern France.

History 
Previous names: Kuctinga (1328), Kuttanges (1476), Kuttingen (1525), Kuchtingen (1575), Kutingen (1600), Kittingen (1665), Kutting (1801).

See also
 Communes of the Moselle department

References

External links
 

Communes of Moselle (department)